The Samsung Galaxy A52 is a mid-range Android-based smartphone developed and manufactured by Samsung Electronics as a part of its Galaxy A series. The phone was announced on 17 March 2021 at Samsung's virtual Awesome Unpacked event alongside the Galaxy A72.

It serves as the successor of the Galaxy A51. It is similar to its predecessor, but features an upgraded 64 MP main camera, an increased-capacity 4500 mAh battery, and IP67 water and dust resistance.

An upgraded device, Galaxy A52s, was first released in August 2021 with a different chipset (Qualcomm Snapdragon 778G), Wi-Fi 6 support and a new device color (Awesome Mint).

Specifications

Design 
Galaxy A52 has a similar design with its predecessor Galaxy A51. It has a Infinity-O display with a cutout for the selfie camera and slim bezels just like the A51. Unilke A51, A52 has matte color options rather than glossy gradient finishes.

The display is protected by Corning Gorilla Glass 5 while the frame and back panel is made of plastic. Both 4G and 5G variants share the identical design. It is available with Awesome Black, Awesome White, Awesome Violet, Awesome Blue options. Both variants have IP67 water and dust resistance.

Hardware 
The Galaxy A52 is powered by Qualcomm Snapdragon 720G SoC with 8 nm process, an octa-core CPU and Adreno 618 GPU. The Galaxy A52 5G is, on the other hand, powered by Qualcomm Snapdragon 750G SoC with 8 nm process, an octa-core CPU and Adreno 619 GPU. The Galaxy A52s received a Qualcomm SM7325 Snapdragon 778G 5G with 6 nm process, an Octa-core CPU (4x2.4 GHz Kryo 670 & 4x1.9 GHz Kryo 670) and an Adreno 642L GPU.

Both A52 and A52 5G feature 6.5 inch Super AMOLED display with 800 nits maximum brightness, 20:9 aspect ratio, 1080x2400 pixels resolution, 411 ppi pixel density and ~84.1% screen-body ratio; however, the display on the A52 has 90 Hz refresh rate and the display on the A52 5G has 120 Hz refresh rate.

Both 4G and 5G variants have a quad rear camera setup with a 64 MP main camera with optical image stabilization (OIS), a 12 MP wide-angle camera, a 5 MP depth camera and a 5 MP depth sensor, and a 32 MP selfie camera.

The device mounts a 3.5mm Audio jack and uses the top earpieces, with the bottom speaker, to deliver stereo sound. Both 4G and 5G variants have a 4500 mAh batteries with 25W fast charging support; however, there is a 15W charger in the box and users need to buy the 25W charger separately.

Software 
Both 4G and 5G variants are shipped with Android 11 and Samsung's proprietary user interface One UI 3.1. Samsung stated that both 4G and 5G variants will get 3 OS version updates, 3 years of monthly updates and 4 years of security updates. As of early 2023, the A52 series has already received an update to Android 13 and One UI 5.0.

References 

Samsung Galaxy
Mobile phones introduced in 2021
Android (operating system) devices
Samsung mobile phones
Phablets
Mobile phones with multiple rear cameras
Mobile phones with 4K video recording